The Mingbulak oil field is an oil field in the Fergana Valley in Uzbekistan. It was first developed in 1992, but abandoned after a massive oil spill. In 2010 it was scheduled to be exploited by Uzbekneftegaz.

References 

Oil fields of Uzbekistan